Lamington is a rural locality in the Scenic Rim Region, Queensland, Australia.

Geography 
Christmas Creek is one of a number of tributaries of the Logan River which have headwaters in the McPherson Range along the border.  The upper Christmas Creek valley is mountainous.  Peaks at Lamington include Little Widgee Mountain, Bujera in the east while across the valley the slopes rise towards Neglected Mountain. The southern boundary follows a section of the western Lamington Plateau and Lamington National Park.

Lamington has the following mountains and cliffs:
  Buchanans Fort (mountain) 
  Little Widgee Mountain 
 Bujera (cliff)
 Hillview Cliffs

History 

The name Bujera is an Aboriginal word meaning "warm, love, adore, a good feeling" of the traditional landowners, the Mununjali people.  

Willowbank Provisional School opened on 20 August 1906. On 1 January 1909 it became Willowbank State School. On 13 July 1914 it was renamed Lamington State School. It closed in April 1943. The school was on Kerry Road and its site is marked with a monument with a plaque.

Lamington was the terminus for one branch of the Beaudesert Shire Tramway.  It operated from 1910 to 1944.

Captain Vance of the Royal Australian Survey Corp established a trigonometrical Station on Hillview Cliffs which was in use from 1924 and 1930.

In the  Lamington had a population of 86 people. The locality contained 58 households, in which 53.5% of the population were males and 46.5% of the population were females with a median age of 48, 10 years above the national average. The average weekly household income was $1,374, $64 below the national average.

Education 
There are no schools in Lamington. The nearest primary school is Hillview State School in neighbouring  Hillview to the north. The nearest secondary school is Beaudesert State High School in Beaudesert to the north.

See also
 List of tramways in Queensland

References

External links 

Scenic Rim Region
1997 establishments in Australia
Populated places established in 1997
Localities in Queensland